is a passenger railway station in the city of Maebashi, Gunma Prefecture, Japan, operated by East Japan Railway Company (JR East). It is one of two main railway stations of Maebashi; the other is Chūō Maebashi Station of the private railway operator Jōmō Electric Railway.

Lines
Maebashi Station is served by the Ryōmō Line, and is located 81.9 kilometers from the starting point of the line at Oyama Station. Some Shōnan Shinjuku Line and the Ueno-Tokyo Line services also originate at this station.

Station layout
The station consists of two elevated island platforms serving three tracks, with the station building underneath. The station has a Midori no Madoguchi ticket office.

Platforms

 Platform 1 mainly serves Oyama-bound trains, while Platforms 2,3 mainly serve Takasaki-bound trains.

History

Maebashi Station was opened by Ryōmō Railway on November 20, 1889. From August 20, 1884, Nippon Railway operated another Maebashi Station on the other side of the Tone River, but this station was closed on December 26, 1889 when a bridge across the river was completed and Nippon Railway trains began sharing the Ryōmō Railway station. Ryōmō Railway was merged into Nippon Railway on January 1, 1897 and Nippon Railway was nationalized on November 1, 1906.

Passenger statistics
In fiscal 2019, the station was used by an average of 10,511 passengers daily (boarding passengers only).

Surrounding area
 Maebashi Omote-machi Post Office

See also
 List of railway stations in Japan

References

External links

 JR East Station information 

Railway stations in Gunma Prefecture
Ryōmō Line
Stations of East Japan Railway Company
Railway stations in Japan opened in 1889
Maebashi